This article lists notable fantasy novels (and novel series). The books appear in alphabetical order by title (beginning with S to Z) (ignoring "A", "An", and "The"); series are alphabetical by author-designated name or, if there is no such, some reasonable designation. Science-fiction novels and short-story collections are not included here.

S 
Sangreal Trilogy by Jan Siegel
The Scarlet Fig by Avram Davidson
The School for Good and Evil series by Soman Chainani
The Sea of Trolls by Nancy Farmer
The Secrets of the Immortal Nicholas Flamel series by Michael Scott
Senlin Ascends by Josiah Bancroft
Septimus Heap series by Angie Sage
The Shadow Campaigns by Django Wexler
The Shadow of What Was Lost by James Islington
Shadow Warrior series by Chris Bunch
Shadowmarch by Tad Williams
Shadowplay by Tad Williams
Shannara series by Terry Brooks
The Shape-Changer's Wife by Sharon Shinn
The Shapeshifter series by Ali Sparkes
Shardik by Richard Adams
The Shattered Goddess by Darrell Schweitzer
Shattered Sea series by Joe Abercrombie
The Shaving of Shagpat by George Meredith
Shrek! by William Steig
The Silent Land by Graham Joyce
The Silmarillion by J. R. R. Tolkien
Silver John series by Manly Wade Wellman
Silverlock by John Myers Myers
Skin of the Sea by Natasha Bowen
Snow White and Rose Red by Patricia C. Wrede
Snow White and the Seven Samurai by Tom Holt
Solstice Wood by Patricia A. McKillip
Some Kind of Fairy Tale by Graham Joyce
Something Rich and Strange by Patricia A. McKillip
Song for the Basilisk by Patricia A. McKillip
A Song of Ice and Fire series by George R. R. Martin
A Song of Wraiths and Ruin by Roseanne A. Brown 
The Song of the Lioness series by Tamora Pierce
The Song of the Shattered Sands series by Bradley Beaulieu
The Sorcerer's Ship by Hannes Bok
The Sorceress and the Cygnet by Patricia A. McKillip
The Spiderwick Chronicles by Holly Black
Spindle's End by Robin McKinley
The Stand by Stephen King
The Starcatchers series by Dave Barry and Ridley Pearson
Stardust by Neil Gaiman
The Stardust Thief by Chelsea Abdullah
The Steerswoman by Rosemary Kirstein
Stone and Sky trilogy by Graham Edwards
Stone of Farewell by Tad Williams
The Stormlight Archive series by Brandon Sanderson
Stravaganza series by Mary Hoffman
The Stress of Her Regard by Tim Powers
Stuart Little by E. B. White
The Sundering Flood by William Morris
The Switchers Trilogy by Kate Thompson
The Sword of Truth series by Terry Goodkind
The Sword Smith by Eleanor Arnason
Swordbird by Nancy Yi Fan
Swords Against the Shadowland by Robin Wayne Bailey
The Swords of Lankhmar by Fritz Leiber
Swordspoint by Ellen Kushner
Symphony of Ages series by Elizabeth Haydon

T
Tailchaser's Song by Tad Williams
Tales From The Flat Earth series by Tanith Lee
The Tales of Alvin Maker series by Orson Scott Card
The Tales Of Beedle The Bard by J.K. Rowling
The Kane Chronicles by Rick Riordan
 The Tales of the Otori by Lian Hearn
Talking Man by Terry Bisson
Tam Lin by Pamela Dean
The Tamuli series by David Eddings
Tara of the Twilight by Lin Carter
Tarzan series by Edgar Rice Burroughs
A Taste of Honey by Kai Ashante Wilson
Ten Silver Coins by Andrew Kooman
These Violent Delights by Chloe Gong 
The Thief of Always by Clive Barker
The Thief Lord by Cornelia Funke
Thieves' World series edited by Robert Asprin and Lynn Abbey
The Third Policeman by Flann O'Brien
Thongor Against the Gods by Lin Carter
Thongor at the End of Time by Lin Carter
Thongor Fights the Pirates of Tarakus by Lin Carter
Thongor in the City of Magicians by Lin Carter
Thongor of Lemuria by Lin Carter
The Three Impostors by Arthur Machen
The Three Worlds Cycle by Ian Irvine
The Chronicles of Thomas Covenant series by Stephen R. Donaldson
Three Hearts and Three Lions by Poul Anderson
Three to See the King by Magnus Mills
The Throme of the Erril of Sherill by Patricia A. McKillip
Through the Looking-Glass by Lewis Carroll
Thunder on the Left by Christopher Morley
Tigana by Guy Gavriel Kay
Tithe: A Modern Faerie Tale by Holly Black
Titus series (aka Gormenghast) by Mervyn Peake
To Green Angel Tower by Tad Williams
Tomoe Gozen series by Jessica Amanda Salmonson
The Tooth Fairy by Graham Joyce
Topper duo by Thorne Smith
The Touch of Evil by John Rackham
The Tower at Stony Wood by Patricia McKillip
Traitor's Blade by Sebastien de Castell
Traitor Son Cycle series by Miles Cameron
The Traitor Baru Cormorant by Seth Dickinson
The Tree of Swords and Jewels by C. J. Cherryh
The Twilight series by Stephenie Meyer
The Tea Master and the Detective by Aliette de Bodard

U
Un Lun Dun by China Miéville
The Underland Chronicles by Suzanne Collins
Unfinished Tales by J. R. R. Tolkien
The Unicorn Series by Tanith Lee
The Unicorns of Balinor by Mary Stanton
The Unspoken Name by A.K. Larkwood

V
Vampire Academy by Richelle Mead
Valhalla by Tom Holt
Velgarth series by Mercedes Lackey
Villains by Necessity by Eve Forward
Viriconium cycle  by M. John Harrison
The Vlad Taltos books by Steven Brust
Von Bek series by Michael Moorcock
A Voyage to Arcturus by David Lindsay

W
The Wardstone Chronicles by Joseph Delaney
War in Heaven by Charles Williams
The War of Dreams (aka The Infernal Desire Machines of Doctor Hoffman) by Angela Carter
The War of the Flowers by Tad Williams
Warbreaker by Brandon Sanderson
The Warrior of World's End by Lin Carter
Warriors Series by Erin Hunter
The Water-Babies, A Fairy Tale for a Land Baby by Charles Kingsley
The Water of the Wondrous Isles by William Morris
Watership Down by Richard Adams
Weaveworld by Clive Barker
The Well at the World's End by William Morris
The Well of the Unicorn by Fletcher Pratt
Wheel of Time series by Robert Jordan
When the Birds Fly South by Stanton A. Coblentz
When the Idols Walked by John Jakes
The Whitby Witches by Robin Jarvis
The White Isle by Darrell Schweitzer
Who's Afraid of Beowulf? by Tom Holt
Who Censored Roger Rabbit? by Gary K. Wolf
The Wind in the Willows by Kenneth Grahame
Wings of Fire series by Tui T. Sutherland
Winnie-The-Pooh by A.A. Milne
Winter Rose by Patricia McKillip
Winter's Tale by Mark Helprin
Winternight trilogy by Katherine Arden
Wish You Were Here by Tom Holt
Wisp of a Thing by Alex Bledsoe
Witch of the Four Winds by John Jakes
The Witcher series by Andrzej Sapkowski
The Witness for the Dead by Katherine Addison
The Wish Giver by Bill Brittain
The Wizard of Lemuria by Lin Carter
Wizard of the Pigeons by Megan Lindholm
The Wizard of Zao by Lin Carter
The Wolf Leader by Alexandre Dumas
The Wolves in the Walls by Neil Gaiman
Women of the Otherworld series by Canadian author Kelley Armstrong.
The Wonderful Wizard of Oz by Frank L. Baum.
The Wood Beyond the World by William Morris
The World According to Novikoff  by Andrei Gusev
The Worldbreaker Saga by Kameron Hurley
The Worm Ouroboros by E. R. Eddison
A Wrinkle in Time by Madeleine L'Engle
Wizard and Glass by Stephen King

X
Xanth series by Piers Anthony

Y
Yamada Monogatari: The Emperor in Shadow by Richard Parks
Yamada Monogatari: The War God's Son by Richard Parks
Yamada Monogatari: To Break the Demon Gate by Richard Parks
Young Wizards series by Diane Duane
Yvgenie by C. J. Cherryh

Z
Zimiamvia series by E. R. Eddison
Zoo City by Lauren Beukes

References

 
Novels (S-Z)
Lists of books by genre
Lists of novels